Q'illu Urqu (Quechua q'illu yellow, urqu mountain, "yellow mountain", Hispanicized spelling Jelloorcco) is a mountain in the Andes of Peru, about  high. It is situated in the Huancavelica Region, Huaytará Province,  Pilpichaca District. It lies southeast of Wakan Q'allay and Qispi Q'awa and northwest of Antara.

References

Mountains of Peru
Mountains of Huancavelica Region